The third series of Ex on the Beach, a British television programme, began airing on 11 August 2015 on MTV. The series concluded on 13 October 2015 after 10 episodes. The group of cast members for this series included former The Only Way Is Essex star Kirk Norcross, whilst exes featured star of Geordie Shore and series 1 returnee Vicky Pattison as well as Rogan O'Connor who was an original cast member from the second series. Jordan Davies also joined the series as an ex having already appeared in Magaluf Weekender as well as Cami-Li, who appeared in fifteenth series of Celebrity Big Brother earlier in the year. This was the first series where the "Tablet of Terror" gave the cast members the decision to evict one another in evil twists. As well as this, it was the first series to include a same-sex ex. The series was filmed in Cancún, Mexico. 

Jordan Davies and Megan McKenna later returned during the fourth series entering as a couple. Jordan made a third appearance during the fifth "All star" series, this time as main cast along with Bear and Jemma, and Holly returning as an ex again. Shortly after this series, in 2016 it was announced that Marty McKenna had joined the cast of Geordie Shore for the twelfth series. Megan McKenna also went on to appear in the seventeenth series of Celebrity Big Brother before later joining the cast of The Only Way Is Essex, where as Stephen Bear also entered the house during the eighteenth series and went on to win. A year later in August 2017, both Jemma Lucy and Jordan Davies took part in the twentieth series.

Cast
The official list of cast members were released on 14 July 2015. They include four boys; Graham Griffiths, Jayden Robins, Kirk Norcross, Stephen Bear, and four girls; Amy Cooke, Laura Summers and Megan McKenna, Megan Rees. With the announcement of the line-up it was confirmed that former Geordie Shore cast member, and star of the first series Vicky Pattison would be making her return as an ex, alongside Series 2 star Rogan O'Connor. The Only Way Is Essex cast member Kirk Norcross was also confirmed to be taking part in the series, with his ex-fiancée and Celebrity Big Brother star Cami-Li featuring as his ex. The Magaluf Weekender star Jordan Davies was also revealed to be taking part in the series, also featuring as an ex.

All original cast members arrived on the beach during the first episode where they were instantly told that they would soon be joined by their exes. Laura's ex-fling Jemma Lucy arrived at the villa during the first episode. This is the first time a same-sex ex has featured in the show. Also arriving in the first episode was Jordan Davies, an ex-boyfriend of Amy wanting to cause some trouble. Marty McKenna arrived during the next episode as the ex-romance of Jemma, then his ex-girlfriend Sarah Goodhart showed up during the third episode desperate to win back his affection. After much anticipation Cami-Li arrived at the beach during the fourth episode and instantly erupted at ex-fiancée Kirk. Soon after this, Kirk and Jemma's brief romance in the villa came to an end and they were added to each other's ex-list. The fifth episode featured the Tablet of Terrors new twist, which allowed Jordan to choose to send somebody home between Jayden and Megan M. He chose Jayden. As well as this, Jordan's ex-girlfriend Ali Drew made her first appearance at the beach, and Griff's ex Holly Rickwood arrived seeking his attention. Star of first series and Geordie Shore, Vicky Pattison arrived during the sixth episode as the ex-girlfriend of Kirk, but due to his ongoing arguments in the house, he voluntarily decided to leave the villa. Megan R's ex-boyfriend Stephen Cochrane made his debut during the seventh episode unsure of his intentions, and Marty was forced to leave the villa due to illness. The villa was left in shock during the eighth episode when the Tablet of Terror ordered Ali to send one of the exes home; she chose Vicky. Following this, Cami-Li decided to leave the beach having completed her mission to make Kirk's life a misery. Star of the second series, Rogan O'Connor also turned up on the beach as Jemma's ex. The ninth episode featured the arrival of Bear's ex-girlfriend and Megan M's ex-best friend Connie Wiltshire who intended to stir things up in the villa.

Bold indicates original cast member; all other cast were brought into the series as an ex.

Duration of cast

Table Key
 Key:  = "Cast member" is featured in this episode
 Key:  = "Cast member" arrives on the beach
 Key:  = "Cast member" has an ex arrive on the beach
 Key:  = "Cast member" arrives on the beach and has an ex arrive during the same episode
 Key:  = "Cast member" leaves the beach
 Key:  = "Cast member" has an ex arrive on the beach and leaves during the same episode
 Key:  = "Cast member" does not feature in this episode

Episodes

{| class="wikitable plainrowheaders" style="width:100%"
|- style="color:black"
! style="background:#FA8258;"| No. inseries
! style="background:#FA8258;"| No. inseason
! style="background:#FA8258;"| Title
! style="background:#FA8258;"| Original air date
! style="background:#FA8258;"| Duration
! style="background:#FA8258;"| UK viewers

|}

Ratings

References

External links
Official website

2015 British television seasons
03